Hicks Lake is a lake in the U.S. state of Washington. 

Hicks Lake was named after Urban East Hicks, pioneer settler and territorial politician.

References

Lakes of Thurston County, Washington